The Women's C-2 500 metres kayaking event at the 2019 Pan American Games was held on 29 July at the Albufera Medio Mundo in the city of Huacho.

Results

Final

References

Canoeing at the 2019 Pan American Games